Jason Sorens (born 1976) is a Senior Research faculty member for the American Institute for Economic Research also known as, AIER. Previously, Sorens served as director of the Center for Ethics in Society at St. Anselm College and prior to his work with St. Anselm, Sorens was a lecturer in the department of government at Dartmouth College. He has been an affiliated scholar with the Mercatus Center at George Mason University since 2008. His primary research interests include fiscal federalism, public policy in federal systems, secessionism, and ethnic politics. Sorens received his B.A. in economics and philosophy, with honors, from Washington and Lee University and his PhD in political science from Yale University. He is the founder of the Free State Project and president of Ethics & Economics Education of New England, an effort to boost ethical and economic literacy in New England through programs for high schoolers, opinion leaders, and the general public.

Personal life
Sorens currently lives in Amherst, New Hampshire.

Free State Project

In July 2001, Sorens published an essay titled "Announcement: The Free State Project", in which he proposed the idea of a political migration, with 20,000 libertarians to move to a single low-population state (New Hampshire, selected in 2003) to make the state a stronghold for libertarian ideas.

As of November 26, 2021, over 20,000 people had signed this statement of intent—completing the original goal—with 5,223 people listed as "movers" to New Hampshire on the FSP website, saying they had already moved to New Hampshire as part of the 20,000+-participant trigger.

Published works
Sorens' work has been published in International Studies Quarterly, Comparative Political Studies, Journal of Peace Research, State Politics and Policy Quarterly, and other academic journals, and his book Secessionism: Identity, Interest, and Strategy was published by McGill-Queen's University Press in 2012.

See also

 Carla Gericke
 Free State Project
 Jeremy Kauffman
 New Hampshire Liberty Alliance
 New Hampshire Liberty Forum
 Porcupine Freedom Festival

References

External links
 Biography at Saint Anselm College
 Biography at Mercatus Center
 Free State Project
 Ethics & Economics Education of New England 
 Secessionism: Identity, Interest, and Strategy by Jason Sorens
 YouTube: A brief history of the Free State Project with FSP founder Jason Sorens
 

Living people
People from Houston
Yale University alumni
American libertarians
Libertarian economists
American political activists
Dartmouth College faculty
Activists from Texas
1976 births